Penafonte is one of seven parishes (administrative divisions) in the municipality of Grandas de Salime, within the province and autonomous community of Asturias, in northern Spain. 

The population is 90 (INE 2006).

Villages and hamlets
 A Brañota
 A Lleira
 A Pontiga
 A Viñola
 Bustelo del Camín
 Penafonte
 Penafurada
 Silvañá
 Soane
 Teixeira
 Valabilleiro
 Veigadecima
 Xestoselo
 Xestoso

References

Parishes in Grandas de Salime